Gavin Ware (born October 19, 1993) is an American professional basketball player for JDA Dijon Basket of the LNB Pro A.

Ware competed in college basketball for Mississippi State. In his senior season, he averaged 15.4 points per game and 7.8 rebounds per game. After graduating, Ware signed with the Port of Antwerp Giants of the Belgian league. In July 2017 he signed a contract with the Paris-Levallois Basket of the National Basketball League of France to play in the 2017-18 season. Ware averaged 12.2 points and 6.7 rebounds per game in Pro A. In July 2018, he signed with JDA Dijon.

On August 14, 2020, Ware signed with s.Oliver Würzburg.

On December 9, 2020, he has signed with BCM Gravelines of the LNB Pro A.

On July 15, 2021, he has signed with and returned back to JDA Dijon Basket of France's LNB Pro A.

References 

1993 births
Living people
American expatriate basketball people in Belgium
American expatriate basketball people in France
American men's basketball players
Antwerp Giants players
Basketball players from Mississippi
BCM Gravelines players
Centers (basketball)
JDA Dijon Basket players
Kumamoto Volters players
Mississippi State Bulldogs men's basketball players
Metropolitans 92 players
Sportspeople from Starkville, Mississippi